is a prefecture of Japan. Okinawa Prefecture is the southernmost and westernmost prefecture of Japan and has a population of 1,457,162 and a geographic area of 2,281 km2 (880 sq mi).

Naha is the capital and largest city, with other major cities including Okinawa, Uruma, and Urasoe. Okinawa Prefecture's largest island, Okinawa Island, is the home to a majority of Okinawa's population. Okinawa's indigenous ethnic group are the Ryukyuan people, who also live in the Amami Islands of Kagoshima Prefecture.

Okinawa was ruled by the Ryukyu Kingdom from 1429 and unofficially annexed by Japan after the Invasion of Ryukyu in 1609. Okinawa was officially founded in 1879 by the Empire of Japan after seven years as the Ryukyu Domain, the last domain of the Han system. Okinawa was occupied by the United States during the Allied occupation of Japan after World War II and was governed by the Military Government of the Ryukyu Islands from 1945 to 1950 and Civil Administration of the Ryukyu Islands from 1950 until the prefecture was returned to Japan in 1972. Okinawa comprises just 0.6 percent of Japan's total land mass, but about 26,000 (75%) of United States Forces Japan personnel are assigned to the prefecture; the continued U.S. military presence in Okinawa is controversial.

History

The oldest evidence of human existence on the Ryukyu Islands is from the Stone Age and was discovered in Naha and Yaeyama. Some human bone fragments though to be from the Paleolithic era were unearthed from a site in Naha, but the artifact was lost in transportation before it was examined. Japanese Jōmon influences are dominant on the Okinawa Islands, although clay vessels on the Sakishima Islands have a commonality with those in Taiwan.

The first mention of the word Ryukyu was written in the Book of Sui. Okinawa was the Japanese word identifying the islands, first seen in the biography of Jianzhen, written in 779. Agricultural societies begun in the 8th century slowly developed until the 12th century. Since the islands are located at the eastern perimeter of the East China Sea relatively close to Japan, China and Southeast Asia, the Ryukyu Kingdom became a prosperous trading nation. Also during this period, many Gusukus, similar to castles, were constructed. The Ryukyu Kingdom entered into the Imperial Chinese tributary system under the Ming dynasty beginning in the 15th century, which established economic relations between the two nations.

In 1609, the Shimazu clan, which controlled the region that is now Kagoshima Prefecture, invaded the Ryukyu Kingdom. The Ryukyu Kingdom was obliged to agree to form a suzerain-vassal relationship with the Satsuma and the Tokugawa shogunate, while maintaining its previous role within the Chinese tributary system; Ryukyuan sovereignty was maintained since complete annexation would have created a conflict with China. The Satsuma clan earned considerable profits from trade with China during a period in which foreign trade was heavily restricted by the shogunate. Although Satsuma maintained strong influence over the islands, the Ryukyu Kingdom maintained a considerable degree of domestic political freedom for over two hundred years.

Four years after the 1868 Meiji Restoration, the Japanese government, through military incursions, officially annexed the kingdom and renamed it Ryukyu han. At the time, the Qing dynasty asserted a nominal suzerainty over the islands. Ryukyu han became Okinawa Prefecture of Japan in 1879, even though all other hans had become prefectures of Japan in 1872.

1945–1965
Near the end of World War II, in 1945, the U.S. Army and Marine Corps launched an invasion of Okinawa with 185,000 troops. They were faced with fanatical resistance from the Japanese defenders. A third of Okinawa's civilian population were killed during the ensuing fighting. The dead, of all nationalities, are commemorated at the Cornerstone of Peace.

After the end of World War II, the United States set up the United States Military Government of the Ryukyu Islands administration, which ruled Okinawa for 27 years. During this "trusteeship rule", the United States established numerous military bases on the Ryukyu islands. The Ryukyu independence movement was an Okinawan movement that clamored against U.S. rule.

Continued U.S. military buildup
During the Korean War, B-29 Superfortresses flew bombing missions over Korea from Kadena Air Base on Okinawa. The military buildup on the island during the Cold War increased a division between local inhabitants and the American military. Under the 1952 Treaty of Mutual Cooperation and Security between the United States and Japan, United States Forces Japan (USFJ) have maintained a large military presence.
 
During the mid-1950s, the U.S. seized land from Okinawans to build new bases or expand currently existing ones. According to the Melvin Price Report, by 1955, the military had displaced 250,000 residents.

Secret U.S. deployment of nuclear weapons
Since 1960, the U.S. and Japan have maintained an agreement that allows the U.S. to secretly bring nuclear weapons into Japanese ports. The Japanese people tended to oppose the introduction of nuclear arms into Japanese territory and the Japanese government's assertion of Japan's non-nuclear policy and a statement of the Three Non-Nuclear Principles reflected this popular opposition. Most of the weapons were alleged to be stored in ammunition bunkers at Kadena Air Base. Between 1954 and 1972, 19 different types of nuclear weapons were deployed in Okinawa, but with fewer than around 1,000 warheads at any one time. In fall 1960, U.S. commandos in Green Light Teams secret training missions carried small nuclear weapons on the east coast of Okinawa Island.

1965–1972 (Vietnam War)
Between 1965 and 1972, Okinawa was a key staging point for United States in its military operations directed towards North Vietnam. Along with Guam, it presented a geographically strategic launch pad for covert bombing missions over Cambodia and Laos. Anti-Vietnam War sentiment became linked politically to the movement for reversion of Okinawa to Japan. In 1965, the U.S. military bases, earlier viewed as paternal post war protection, were increasingly seen as aggressive. The Vietnam War highlighted the differences between United States and Okinawa but showed a commonality between the islands and mainland Japan.

As controversy grew regarding the alleged placement of nuclear weapons on Okinawa, fears intensified over the escalation of the Vietnam War. Okinawa was perceived by some inside Japan as a potential target for China, should the communist government feel threatened by United States. American military secrecy blocked any local reporting on what was actually occurring at bases such as Kadena Air Base. As information leaked out, and images of air strikes were published, the local population began to fear the potential for retaliation.

Political leaders such as Makoto Oda, a major figure in the Beheiren movement (Foundation of Citizens for Peace in Vietnam), believed that the return of Okinawa to Japan would lead to the removal of U.S. forces ending Japan's involvement in Vietnam. In a speech delivered in 1967 Oda was critical of Prime Minister Eisaku Satō's unilateral support of America's war in Vietnam claiming "Realistically we are all guilty of complicity in the Vietnam War". The Beheiren became a more visible anti-war movement on Okinawa as the American involvement in Vietnam intensified. The movement employed tactics ranging from demonstrations to handing leaflets to soldiers, sailors, airmen and Marines directly, warning of the implications for a third World War.

The U.S. military bases on Okinawa became a focal point for anti-Vietnam War sentiment. By 1969, over 50,000 American military personnel were stationed on Okinawa. United States Department of Defense began referring to Okinawa as the "Keystone of the Pacific". This slogan was imprinted on local U.S. military license plates.

In 1969, chemicals leaked from the U.S. storage depot at Chibana in central Okinawa, under Operation Red Hat. Evacuations of residents took place over a wide area for two months. Even two years later, government investigators found that Okinawans and the environment near the leak were still suffering because of the depot.

On May 15, 1972, the U.S. government handed over the islands to Japanese administration.

1973–2006
The 1995 rape of a 12-year-old girl by U.S. servicemen triggered large protests in Okinawa. Reports by the local media of accidents and crimes committed by U.S. servicemen have reduced the local population's support for the U.S. military bases. A strong emotional response has emerged from certain incidents. As a result, the media has drawn renewed interest in the Ryukyu independence movement.

Documents declassified in 1997 proved that both tactical and strategic weapons have been maintained in Okinawa. In 1999 and 2002, the Japan Times and the Okinawa Times reported speculation that not all weapons were removed from Okinawa. On October 25, 2005, after a decade of negotiations, the governments of the U.S. and Japan officially agreed to move Marine Corps Air Station Futenma from its location in the densely populated city of Ginowan to the more northerly and remote Camp Schwab in Nago by building a heliport with a shorter runway, partly on Camp Schwab land and partly running into the sea. The move is partly an attempt to relieve tensions between the people of Okinawa and the Marine Corps.

Okinawa prefecture constitutes 0.6% of Japan's land surface, yet , 75% of all USFJ bases were located on Okinawa, and U.S. military bases occupied 18% of the main island.

2007–present
According to a 2007 Okinawa Times poll, 85% of Okinawans opposed the presence of the U.S. military, because of noise pollution from military drills, the risk of aircraft accidents, environmental degradation, and crowding from the number of personnel there, although 73% percent of Japanese citizens appreciated the mutual security treaty with the U.S. and the presence of the USFJ. In another poll conducted by The Asahi Shimbun in May 2010, 43% of the Okinawan population wanted the complete closure of the U.S. bases, 42% wanted reduction, and 11% wanted to maintain status quo. Okinawan feelings about the U.S. military are complex, and some of the resentment towards the U.S. bases is directed towards the government in Tokyo, perceived as being insensitive to Okinawan needs and using Okinawa to house bases not desired elsewhere in Japan.

In early 2008, U.S. Secretary of State Condoleezza Rice apologized after a series of crimes involving American troops in Japan, including the rape of a young girl of 14 by a Marine on Okinawa. The U.S. military imposed a temporary 24-hour curfew on military personnel and their families to ease the anger of local residents. Some cited statistics that the crime rate of military personnel is consistently less than that of the general Okinawan population. However, some criticized the statistics as unreliable, since violence against women is under-reported. Between 1972 and 2009, U.S. servicemen committed 5,634 criminal offenses, including 25 murders, 385 burglaries, 25 arsons, 127 rapes, 306 assaults and 2,827 thefts. Yet, per Marine Corps Installations Pacific data, U.S. service members are convicted of far fewer crimes than local Okinawans.

In 2009, a new Japanese government came to power and froze the U.S. forces relocation plan but in April 2010 indicated their interest in resolving the issue by proposing a modified plan. A study done in 2010 found that the prolonged exposure to aircraft noise around the Kadena Air Base and other military bases cause health issues such as a disrupted sleep pattern, high blood pressure, weakening of the immune system in children, and a loss of hearing.

In 2011, it was reported that the U.S. military—contrary to repeated denials by The Pentagon—had kept tens of thousands of barrels of Agent Orange on the island. The Japanese and American governments have angered some U.S. veterans, who believe they were poisoned by Agent Orange while serving on the island, by characterizing their statements regarding Agent Orange as "dubious", and ignoring their requests for compensation. Reports that more than a third of the barrels developed leaks have led Okinawans to ask for environmental investigations, but  both Tokyo and Washington refused such action. Jon Mitchell has reported concern that the U.S. used American Marines as chemical-agent guinea pigs.

On September 30, 2018, Denny Tamaki was elected as the next governor of Okinawa prefecture, after a campaign focused on sharply reducing the U.S. military presence on the island.

Marine Corps Air Station Futenma relocation 

In 2006, some 8,000 U.S. Marines were removed from the island and relocated to Guam. The move to Marine Corps Base Camp Blaz is expected to be completed in 2023. Japan paid for a majority of the cost to construct the new base. The U.S. still maintains Air Force, Marine, Navy, and Army military installations on the islands. These bases include Kadena Air Base, Camp Foster, Marine Corps Air Station Futenma, Camp Hansen, Camp Schwab, Torii Station, Camp Kinser, and Camp Gonsalves. Okinawa hosts about two-thirds of the 50,000 American forces in Japan although the islands account for less than one percent of total lands in Japan.

Suburbs have grown towards and now surround two historic major bases, Futenma and Kadena. A sizeable portion of the land used by the U.S. military is Camp Gonsalves in the north of the island. On December 21, 2016, 10,000 acres of Camp Gonslaves were returned to Japan. On June 25, 2018, Okinawa residents held a protest demonstration at sea against scheduled land reclamation work for the relocation of a U.S. military base within Japan's southernmost island prefecture. A protest gathered hundreds of people.

Since the early 2000s, Okinawans have opposed the presence of American troops helipads in the Takae zone of the Yanbaru forest near Higashi and Kunigami. This opposition grew in July 2016 after the construction of six new helipads.

Geography

Major islands

Okinawa's inhabited islands are typically divided into three geographical archipelagos. From northeast to southwest:
 
 Iejima
 Kume-jima
 Okinawa Island
 Kerama Islands
 Miyako Islands
 Miyako-jima
 Yaeyama Islands
 Iriomote Island
 Ishigaki Island
 Yonaguni
 Senkaku Islands
 Daitō Islands
 Minamidaitōjima
 Kitadaitōjima
 Okidaitōjima

Natural parks
Approximately 36% percent of the total land area of the prefecture was designated as natural parks, namely the Iriomote-Ishigaki, Kerama Shotō, and Yambaru National Parks; Okinawa Kaigan and Okinawa Senseki Quasi-National Parks; and Irabu, Kumejima, Tarama, and Tonaki Prefectural Natural Parks.

Ecology
The dugong is an endangered marine mammal related to the manatee. Iriomote is home to one of the world's rarest and most endangered cat species, the Iriomote cat. The region is also home to at least one endemic pit viper, Trimeresurus elegans. The islands of Okinawa are surrounded by some of the most abundant coral reefs found in the world.  The world's largest colony of rare blue coral is found off of Ishigaki Island. The sea turtles return yearly to the southern islands of Okinawa to lay their eggs. The summer months carry warnings to swimmers regarding venomous jellyfish and other dangerous sea creatures.

Okinawa is a major producer of sugar cane, pineapple, papaya, and other tropical fruit, and the Southeast Botanical Gardens represent tropical plant species.

Geology
The island is largely composed of coral, and rainwater filtering through that coral has given the island many caves, which played an important role in the Battle of Okinawa. Gyokusendo is an extensive limestone cave in the southern part of Okinawa's main island.

Climate
The island experiences temperatures above  for most of the year. The climate of the islands ranges from humid subtropical climate (Köppen climate classification Cfa) in the north, such as Okinawa Island, to tropical rainforest climate (Köppen climate classification Af) in the south such as Iriomote Island. Snowfall is unheard of at sea level. However, on January 24, 2016, sleet was reported in Nago for the first time on record.

Municipalities

Cities

Eleven cities are located within the Okinawa Prefecture:

Towns and villages
These are the towns and villages in each district:

Town mergers

Demography

Ethnic groups 
The indigenous Ryukyuan people make up the majority of Okinawa Prefecture's population and are also the main ethnic group of the Amami Islands to the north. Large Okinawan diaspora communities persist in places such as South America and Hawaii. With the introduction of American military bases, there are an increasing number of half-American children in Okinawa, including prefecture governor Denny Tamaki. The prefecture also has a sizable minority of Yamato people from mainland Japan; exact population numbers are difficult to establish, as the Japanese government does not officially recognise Ryukyuans as a distinct ethnic group from Yamatos.

The overall ethnic identity of Okinawa residents is rather split. According to a telephone poll conducted by Lim John Chuan-tiong, an associate professor with the University of the Ryukyus, 40.6% of respondents identified as “ (Okinawan)”, 21.3% identified as “ (Japanese)” and 36.5% identified as both.

Population 
Okinawa prefecture age pyramid 
(per thousands of people)
Okinawa Prefecture age pyramid, divided by sex, 
(per thousands of people)

Per Japanese census data, Okinawa prefecture has had continuous positive population growth since 1960.

Language and culture

Having been a separate nation until 1879, Okinawan language and culture differ in many ways from those of mainland Japan.

Language
There remain six Ryukyuan languages which, although related, are incomprehensible to speakers of Japanese. One of the Ryukyuan languages is spoken in Kagoshima Prefecture, rather than in Okinawa Prefecture. These languages are in decline as the younger generation of Okinawans uses Standard Japanese. Mainland Japanese and some Okinawans generally perceive the Ryukyuan languages as "dialects". Standard Japanese is almost always used in formal situations. In informal situations, de facto everyday language among Okinawans under age 60 is Okinawa-accented mainland Japanese ("Okinawan Japanese"), which is often mistaken by non-Okinawans as the Okinawan language proper. The actual traditional Okinawan language is still used in traditional cultural activities, such as folk music and folk dance. There is a radio-news program in the language as well.

Religion

Okinawans have traditionally followed Ryukyuan religious beliefs, generally characterized by ancestor worship and the respecting of relationships between the living, the dead, and the gods and spirits of the natural world.

Culture
Okinawan culture bears traces of its various trading partners. One can find Chinese, Thai and Austronesian influences in the island's customs. Perhaps Okinawa's most famous cultural export is karate, probably a product of the close ties with and influence of China on Okinawan culture. Karate is thought to be a synthesis of Chinese kung fu with traditional Okinawan martial arts.

A traditional Okinawan product that owes its existence to Okinawa's trading history is awamori—an Okinawan distilled spirit made from indica rice imported from Thailand.

Other prominent examples of Okinawan culture include the sanshin—a three-stringed Okinawan instrument, closely related to the Chinese sanxian, and ancestor of the Japanese shamisen, somewhat similar to a banjo. Its body is often bound with snakeskin (from pythons, imported from elsewhere in Asia, rather than from Okinawa's venomous Trimeresurus flavoviridis, which are too small for this purpose). Okinawan culture also features the eisa dance, a traditional drumming dance. A traditional craft, the fabric named bingata, is made in workshops on the main island and elsewhere.

The Okinawan diet consists of low-fat, low-salt foods, such as whole fruits and vegetables, legumes, tofu, and seaweed. Okinawans are particularly well known for consuming purple potatoes, also known as Okinawan sweet potatoes. Okinawans are known for their longevity. This particular island is a so-called Blue Zone, an area where the people live longer than most others elsewhere in the world. Five times as many Okinawans live to be 100 as in the rest of Japan, and Japanese are already the longest-lived ethnic group globally.  there were 34.7 centenarians for every 100,000 inhabitants, which is the highest ratio worldwide. Possible explanations are diet, low-stress lifestyle, caring community, activity, and spirituality of the inhabitants of the island.

A cultural feature of the Okinawans is the forming of moais. A  is a community social gathering and groups that come together to provide financial and emotional support through emotional bonding, advice giving, and social funding. This provides a sense of security for the community members and as mentioned in the Blue Zone studies, may be a contributing factor to the longevity of its people.

The prize was also won by Okinawans in 1967 by Tatsuhiro Oshiro for Cocktail Party and in 1971 by Mineo Higashi for Okinawan Boy.

Karate
Karate originated in Okinawa. Over time, it developed into several styles and sub-styles. On Okinawa, the three main styles are considered to be Shōrin-ryū, Gōjū-ryū and Uechi-ryū. Internationally, the various styles and sub-styles include Matsubayashi-ryū, Wadō-ryū, Isshin-ryū, Shōrinkan, Shotokan, Shitō-ryū, Shōrinjiryū Kenkōkan, Shorinjiryu Koshinkai, and Shōrinji-ryū.

Architecture

Despite widespread destruction during World War II, there are many remains of a unique type of castle or fortress known as gusuku; the most significant are inscribed on the UNESCO World Heritage List (Gusuku Sites and Related Properties of the Kingdom of Ryukyu). In addition, twenty-three Ryukyuan architectural complexes and forty historic sites have been designated for protection by the national government. Shuri Castle in Naha is an UNESCO World Heritage Site.

Whereas most homes in Japan are made from wood and allow free-flow of air to combat humidity, typical modern homes in Okinawa are made from concrete with barred windows to protect from flying plant debris and to withstand regular typhoons. Roofs are designed with strong winds in mind, in which each tile is cemented on and not merely layered as seen with many homes in Japan. The Nakamura House (:ja:中村家住宅 (沖縄県)) is an original 18th century farmhouse in Kitanakagusuki. Many roofs also display a lion-dog statue, called a shisa, which is said to protect the home from danger. Roofs are typically red in color and are inspired by Chinese design.

Education
The public schools in Okinawa are overseen by the Okinawa Prefectural Board of Education. The agency directly operates several public high schools including Okinawa Shogaku High School. The U.S. Department of Defense Dependents Schools operates 13 schools total in Okinawa. Seven of these schools are located on Kadena Air Base.

Okinawa has many types of private schools. Some of them are cram schools, also known as juku. Others, such as Nova, solely teach language. There are 10 colleges/universities in Okinawa, including the University of the Ryukyus, the only national university in the prefecture, and the Okinawa Institute of Science and Technology, a new international research institute. Okinawa's American military bases also host the Asian Division of the University of Maryland University College.

Sports
Association football
 FC Ryukyu (Naha)
Basketball
 Ryukyu Golden Kings (Naha)
Handball
 Ryukyu Corazon (Naha)
Baseball

Announced on July 18, 2019, BASE Okinawa Baseball Club will be forming the first-ever professional baseball team on Okinawa, the Ryukyu Blue Oceans. The team is expected to be fully organized by January 2020 and intends on joining the Nippon Professional Baseball league.

In addition, various baseball teams from Japan hold training during the winter in Okinawa prefecture as it is the warmest prefecture of Japan with no snow and higher temperatures than other prefectures.

 SoftBank Hawks
 Yokohama BayStars
 Chunichi Dragons
 Yakult Swallows
Golf
There are numerous golf courses in the prefecture, and there was formerly a professional tournament called the Okinawa Open.

Transportation

Air transportation
 Aguni Airport
 Hateruma Airport
 Iejima Airport
 New Ishigaki Airport
 Kerama Airport
 Kitadaito Airport
 Kumejima Airport
 Minami-Daito Airport
 Miyako Airport
 Naha Airport
 Shimojishima Airport
 Tarama Airport
 Yonaguni Airport

Highways

Rail

 Okinawa Urban Monorail

Ports
The major ports of Okinawa include:
 Naha Port
 Port of Unten
 Port of Kinwan
 Nakagusukuwan Port
 Hirara Port
 Port of Ishigaki

Economy
The 34 U.S. military installations on Okinawa are financially supported by the U.S. and Japan. The bases provide jobs for Okinawans, both directly and indirectly; In 2011, the U.S. military employed over 9,800 Japanese workers in Okinawa.  the bases accounted for up to 5% of the economy. However, Koji Taira argued in 1997 that because the U.S. bases occupy around 20% of Okinawa's land, they impose a deadweight loss of 15% on the Okinawan economy. The Tokyo government also pays the prefectural government around ¥10 billion per year in compensation for the American presence, including, for instance, rent paid by the Japanese government to the Okinawans on whose land American bases are situated. A 2005 report by the U.S. Forces Japan Okinawa Area Field Office estimated that in 2003 the combined U.S. and Japanese base-related spending contributed $1.9 billion to the local economy. On January 13, 2015, In response to the citizens electing governor Takeshi Onaga, the national government announced that Okinawa's funding will be cut, due to the governor's stance on removing the US military bases from Okinawa, which the national government does not want happening.

The Okinawa Convention and Visitors Bureau is exploring the possibility of using facilities on the military bases for large-scale meetings, incentives, conferencing, exhibitions events.

United States military installations

 United States Marine Corps
 Marine Corps Base Camp Smedley D. Butler
 Camp Foster
 Marine Corps Air Station Futenma
 Camp Kinser
 Camp Courtney
 Camp McTureous
 Camp Hansen
 Camp Schwab
 Camp Gonsalves (Jungle Warfare Training Center)
 United States Air Force
Kadena Air Base
Okuma Beach Resort
 United States Navy
 Camp Lester (Camp Kuwae)
 Camp Shields
 Naval Facility White Beach
 United States Army
 Torii Station
 Fort Buckner
 Naha Military Port

Notable people
 Aisa Senda, singer, actress and TV presenter in Taiwan
 Awich, rapper, singer and songwriter
 Beni Japanese pop and R&B singer
 Byron Fija Okinawan language practitioner and activist
 Chikako Yamashiro filmmaker and video artist
 Chōjun Miyagi founder of Gōjū-ryū, "hard/soft" style of Okinawan Karate.
 Daichi Miura Japanese pop singer, dancer and choreographer.
 Merle Dandridge Japanese American actress and singer
 Eisaku Satō Japanese politician and the 61st, 62nd and 63rd Prime Minister of Japan. 
 Gackt Japanese pop rock singer-songwriter, actor, author
 Gichin Funakoshi led the efforts to propagate Okinawa karate to the Japanese mainland and beyond to the World.
 Robert Griffin III, American football quarterback, Heisman Trophy winner
 Hearts Grow Japanese band
 Isamu Chō officer in the Imperial Japanese Army known for his support of ultranationalist politics and involvement in a number of attempted military and right-wing coup d'états in pre-World War II Japan.
 Jin Matsuda, singer, member of INI (Japanese boy group), a former contestant on Produce 101 Japan (season 2)
 Matayoshi Eiki Okinawan novel writer, winner of Akutagawa prize
 Mitsuru Ushijima general at the Battle of Okinawa
 Namie Amuro Japanese R&B, hip hop and pop singer
 Noriyuki Sugasawa basketball player
 Orange Range Japanese rock band
 Ōta Minoru admiral in the Imperial Japanese Navy during World War II
 Rimi Natsukawa (夏川 りみ Natsukawa Rimi), Japanese women pop singers
 Rino Nakasone Razalan professional dancer and choreographer.
 Dave Roberts, Major League Baseball player and manager
Saori Minami Japanese kayōkyoku pop singer
Ben Shepherd Bassist of the band Soundgarden
 Sho Yonashiro, singer, member of JO1, a former contestant on Produce 101 Japan
 Stereopony Japanese all-female pop rock band
 Takuji Iwasaki meteorologist, biologist, ethnologist historian.
 Tamlyn Tomita actress and singer
Tina Tamashiro, Fashion Model and Actress
Uechi Kanbun founder of Uechi-ryū, one of the primary karate styles of Okinawa.
Yabu Kentsū prominent teacher of Shōrin-ryū karate in Okinawa from the 1910s until the 1930s, and was among the first people to demonstrate karate in Hawaii.
Yoshitaka Funakoshi made significant and innovative contributions to Okinawan karate leading to the style known as Shotokan.
Yui Aragaki actress, singer, and model
Yuken Teruya interdisciplinary artist
Yukie Nakama singer, musician and actress

See also
 Okinawa Prefectural Assembly
 Names of Okinawa

Notes

References

External links

Okinawa Prefectural Government Washington DC Office 
Official Okinawa Prefecture website 
Official Okinawa Prefecture website 
Ryukyu Cultural Archives
Okinawa Prefectural Peace Memorial Museum

 
Blue zones
Former regions and territories of the United States
Japan–United States relations
Kyushu region
Prefectures of Japan
Ryukyu Islands